Kirugavalu was one of the 224 constituencies in the Karnataka Legislative Assembly of Karnataka a south state of India. It was also part of Mandya Lok Sabha constituency.

Member of Legislative Assembly

Mysore State (Kirugavalu Vidhana Sabha constituency)
 1951 - 1962: See Malavalli Assembly constituency
 1962: M. Mallikarjunaswamy, Indian National Congress
 1967: G. Madegowda, Indian National Congress
 1972: G. Madegowda, Indian National Congress (Organization)

Karnataka State (Kiragaval Vidhana Sabha constituency)
 1978: G. Madegowda, Janata Party
 1983: G. Madegowda, Indian National Congress
 1985: G. Madegowda, Indian National Congress
 1989: K. M. Puttu, Indian National Congress
 1994: K. N. Nagegowda, Janata Dal
 1999: D. C. Thammanna, Indian National Congress
 2004: M. K. Nagamani, Janata Dal (United)
 2008 onwards: See Malavalli Assembly constituency

See also
 Mandya district
 List of constituencies of Karnataka Legislative Assembly

References

Former assembly constituencies of Karnataka
Mandya district